Anders Thorsen Syrtveit, also known as Anders Thorson Syrtveit and Anders Thorsen Solberg, (born 1778 in Iveland, died 1857 in Evje) was a Norwegian builder and architect. Syrtveit also went by the name "Anders kirkebygger" and is especially known for a number of church buildings in Southern Norway, particularly in the Setesdal region of Agder. Syrtveit is listed both as an architect and builder for several churches. The boundaries between these professions were unclear because the old builders "built on their own" without formal architecture training. He built octagonal and cruciform churches in addition to building houses and other types of buildings.

Works
These are the churches that he built (or helped build):
In Bygland: Årdal Church, Bygland Church, and Sandnes Church
In Evje og Hornnes: Evje Church (demolished in 1891) and Hornnes Church (remodeled the roof and tower)
In Fyresdal: Moland Church
In Iveland: Iveland Church 
In Valle: Hylestad Church and Valle Church
In Vennesla: Hægeland Church

References

1778 births
1857 deaths
People from Aust-Agder
19th-century Norwegian architects